Brazil–Palestine relations refers to the current and historical bilateral relationship between Brazil and Palestine. On 5 December 2010, Brazil officially recognized the State of Palestine including all of the West Bank and the Gaza Strip, and having Jerusalem as its capital. In 2015, the Embassy of the State of Palestine to Brazil was opened in Brazil's capital, Brasília, and the Brazilian government received an area in Ramallah for installing its diplomatic mission to Palestine.

Palestinian statehood
In 2010, Brazil has firmly stressed its support for a Palestinian state within the borders of 1967 (that is, including West Bank and the Gaza Strip) and having Jerusalem as its capital. The Brazilian Government has also advocated the end of the blockade of the Gaza Strip. On 5 December 2010, it formally recognized the State of Palestine in the 1967 borders, including all of the West Bank, Gaza Strip and East Jerusalem. The move initiated a chain reaction through the region. Given Brazil's economic prominence, its South American neighbors likely saw low political risks in following Brasília’s lead. In her address to the General Assembly, President Dilma Rousseff reiterated her country's firm support: "We believe the time has come for us to have Palestine fully represented as a full member in this forum." Brazil voted in favor of Palestine's admission as a full member of UNESCO and has announced it will support Palestine's full membership application when it comes to a vote at the Security Council.

In 2015, the Embassy of the State of Palestine to Brazil was opened in Brazil's capital, Brasília, and the Brazilian government received an area in Ramallah for installing its diplomatic mission to Palestine.

Following the 2018 Brazilian presidential election, President-elect Jair Bolsonaro, a staunch pro-Israel individual, stated that he would close the Palestinian embassy, and stated that Palestine 'is not a country.'

In March 2019, Palestinians officials condemned Brazil’s opening of commercial office in Jerusalem because Palestinian officials consider Jerusalem as an integral part of the occupied Palestinian territories.  Palestinians also condemned the visit of Brazilian President Jair Bolsonaro to Jerusalem’s Western Wall accompanied by Israel’s prime minister in 2019.

Under Bolsonaro, Brazil has voted against Palestine in multilateral forums, meaning a clear worsening of Brazil-Palestine relations. In February 2020, Brazil asked the International Criminal Court (ICC) to stop its investigation into Israel for war crimes committed against the Palestinian people. In November 2020, Brazil voted against the approval of a resolution at the World Health Organisation (WHO) to guarantee access to healthcare services for the Palestinian population residing in the occupied territories.

See also 
 Foreign relations of Brazil
 Foreign relations of the State of Palestine

References

 
Palestine
Bilateral relations of the State of Palestine